Purification is the process of rendering something pure, i.e. clean of foreign elements and/or pollution, and may refer to:

Religion
 Ritual purification, the religious activity to remove uncleanliness
 Purification after death
 Purification of the Virgin, a Christian liturgical feast
 Purification Rundown, in Scientology

Other uses
 Purification (album), a 2002 Crimson Thorn album
 Purification of quantum state in quantum mechanics, especially quantum information
 Purification theorem in game theory and economics, a Nash equilibrium consisting of randomly mixed strategies
 Water purification
 Organisms used in water purification
 List of purification methods in chemistry

See also
Purificación (disambiguation)
Purify (disambiguation)
Purified (disambiguation)

de:Reinigung